Seticosta homosacta is a species of moth of the family Tortricidae. It is found in Ecuador and Peru.

References

Moths described in 1930
Seticosta